Kenali Besar is a village in the Jambi Province of Sumatra, Indonesia. It is located 4.1 miles outside the city of Jambi.

Nearby towns and villages include Pijoan (3.6 nm), Mendalo (2.2 nm), Paalmerah (6.1 nm) and Tempino (10.4 nm)

References

External links
Satellite map at Maplandia.com

Populated places in Jambi